Miracle berry may refer to:

Synsepalum dulcificum, source of berries that increases the perceived sweetness of foods
Thaumatococcus daniellii, source of a spice that has an intensely sweet flavor